Ali Golzadeh Ghafouri (14 May 1923 – 1 January 2010) was an Iranian Shia cleric and religious progressive politician.

Political career 
He ran as an independent candidate in the 1979 Iranian Constitutional Convention election. He criticized the conventional notions of private property by the establishment and enjoyed support by the People's Mujahedin of Iran, along with Mahmoud Taleghani. He was among the members of the post-revolutionary constituent assembly opposing to inclusion of Guardianship of the Islamic Jurist in the constitution.

In 1980, he was elected to the parliament, and was considered sympathetic to the Freedom Movement of Iran and the parliamentary opposition to the ruling Islamic Republican Party.

He left politics in 1981 and died in January 2010.

Electoral history

Personal life
All three his children and his son-in-law were members of the People's Mujahedin of Iran (MEK) and were executed by the authorities.

References

1923 births
2010 deaths
20th-century Muslim scholars of Islam
Members of the Assembly of Experts for Constitution
Iranian Shia clerics
University of Paris alumni
Academic staff of the University of Tehran
Iranian jurists
Iranian expatriates in France